Mount Stierer is a mountain (1,080 m) rising 1.5 nautical miles (2.8 km) north-northeast of Mount Bellingshausen in the Prince Albert Mountains, Victoria Land. Mapped by United States Geological Survey (USGS) from surveys and U.S. Navy air photos, 1957–62. Named by Advisory Committee on Antarctic Names (US-ACAN) after Byron A. Stierer, Airman First Class, United States Air Force (USAF), a member of the McMurdo Station wintering party, 1962.

Mountains of Victoria Land
Scott Coast